Best or The Best may refer to:

People
 Best (surname), people with the surname Best
 Best (footballer, born 1968), retired Portuguese footballer

Companies and organizations
 Best & Co., an 1879–1971 clothing chain
 Best Lock Corporation, a lock manufacturer 
 Best Manufacturing Company, a farm machinery company
 Best Products, a chain of catalog showroom retail stores 
 Brihanmumbai Electric Supply and Transport, a public transport and utility provider
 Best High School (disambiguation)

Acronyms
 Berkeley Earth Surface Temperature, a project to assess global temperature records
 BEST Robotics, a student competition
 BioEthanol for Sustainable Transport
 Bootstrap error-adjusted single-sample technique, a statistical method
 Bringing Examination and Search Together, a European Patent Office initiative
 Bronx Environmental Stewardship Training, a program of the Sustainable South Bronx organization
 Smart BEST, a Japanese experimental train
 Brihanmumbai Electric Supply and Transport, in Mumbai, India

Film and television
 Best (film), a 2000 George Best biopic
 The Best (TV series), a 2002 British cooking programme
 Best: His Mother's Son, a 2009 made-for-TV drama about George Best's mother

Music
 The Best (band), a music supergroup featuring Keith Emerson, John Entwistle and others
 Best (band), now known as Mclusky

Albums
 Best (After School album), 2015
 Best (Akina Nakamori album), 1986
 Best (Garnet Crow album), 2005
 Best (High and Mighty Color album), 2008
 Best (Kenny G album), 2006
 Best (Mika Nakashima album), 2005
 Best (Robert Earl Keen album), 2006
 Best! (Jellyfish album), 2006
 A Best, by Ayumi Hamasaki, 2001
 The Best (Ana Gabriel album), 1992
 The Best (Ariana Grande album), 2017
 The Best (Bonnie Tyler album) or the 1988 title song (see below), 1993
 The Best (Dan Seals album), 1987
 The Best (David Lee Roth album), 1997
 The Best (Despina Vandi album), 2001
 The Best (Edmond Leung album), 1994
 The Best (George Clinton album), 1995
 The Best (Girls' Generation album), 2014
 The Best (James Reyne album), 1992
 The Best (Janet Jackson album) or Number Ones, 2009
 The Best (Leo Kottke album), 1976
 The Best (t.A.T.u. album), 2006
 The Best (Yōko Oginome album), 1985
 The Best (video), by Bonfire, 1993
 Aya Matsuura Best 1, 2005
 Best... I, by the Smiths, 1992
 ...Best II, by the Smiths, 1992
 Best 1991–2004, by Seal, 2004
 Best: Bounce & Lovers, by Koda Kumi, 2007
 Best: Fan's Selection, by X Japan, 2001
 Best: First Things, by Koda Kumi, 2005
 Best: Second Session, by Koda Kumi, 2006
 Best: The Greatest Hits of S Club 7, 2003
 Best: Third Universe, by Koda Kumi, 2010
 Best! Morning Musume 1, 2001
 Best! Morning Musume 2, 2004
 Best! Morning Musume 20th Anniversary, 2019
 The Best!: Updated Morning Musume, 2013
 The Best '03–'09, by Yuko Ando, 2009
 The Best: Make the Music Go Bang!, by X, 2004
 The Best: Sittin' in Again, by Loggins and Messina, 2005
 Best, by the Clark Sisters, 1986

Songs
 "The Best" (song), by Bonnie Tyler, 1988; covered by Tina Turner, 1989
 "The Best", by …And You Will Know Us by the Trail of Dead from Worlds Apart, 2005
 "The Best", by Anthony Ramos from the soundtrack of the film Space Jam: A New Legacy, 2021
 "The Best", by Awolnation from Angel Miners & the Lightning Riders, 2020

Other uses
 .best, an Internet top-level domain
 The Best FIFA Football Awards
 Best, Netherlands, a municipality in the southern Netherlands
 Best bitter, a type of beer
 Best disease, a disease of the eye
 The Best (PlayStation), PlayStation budget range in Japan
 Best magazine, a UK weekly woman's magazine

See also

 
 All My Best (disambiguation)
 Best II (disambiguation)
 Das Beste (disambiguation)